Lewis Silkin, 1st Baron Silkin CH (14 November 1889 – 11 May 1972), was a British Labour Party politician.

Career 
Lewis Silkin was born on 14 November 1889 to Abraham and Fanny Silkin, who were Litvak Jews from what was then the Lithuanian part of the Russian Empire. His parents came to settle in the East End of London and were of modest means, Abraham cleaned the toilets of the Synagogue, gave Hebrew lessons and sold fruit off a barrow. Lewis had several siblings, including Joseph Silkin (father of the poet Jon Silkin) who he worked with as a solicitor and with whom he co-founded Lewis Silkin LLP together, the London law firm where he practised and which still bears his name. He became a member of the London County Council in 1925. He chaired the LCC Town Planning and the Housing and Public Health Committees and was a member of the Central Housing Advisory Committee.

He was elected as Member of Parliament (MP) for Peckham in 1936, and was a member of the Select committee on National Expenditure. He was Minister of Town and Country Planning in the Government of Clement Attlee from 1945 until he retired in 1950. He appointed Monica Felton as the first woman Deputy Chairman of the Stevenage Development Corporation in 1946 (who then became the first female chairman between 1949 and 1951) and appointed Baroness Denington as the second female chairman of the same corporation in 1966.

Honours 
Silkin was raised to the peerage as Baron Silkin, of Dulwich in the County of London, in the 1950 Birthday Honours. He was further honoured in 1965 when he was made a Companion of Honour. Of his three sons, his eldest, Arthur, a civil servant, disclaimed the peerage. The other two, Samuel and John, both followed him into Parliament and became members of the Privy Council as well as Government Ministers. Although Samuel refused a knighthood as Attorney-General, he eventually became a life peer as Baron Silkin of Dulwich, of North Leigh in the County of Oxfordshire.

Samuel's son Christopher also disclaimed the hereditary peerage on the death of his uncle Arthur in 2001, the first time a peerage has been disclaimed twice.

See also 
 Lewis Silkin LLP
 Silkin Test

References 
 

 Oxford Dictionary of National Biography

External links 
 

1889 births
1972 deaths
Labour Party (UK) MPs for English constituencies
UK MPs 1935–1945
UK MPs 1945–1950
UK MPs who were granted peerages
English Jews
English people of Lithuanian-Jewish descent
Members of London County Council
People from Dulwich
Members of the Privy Council of the United Kingdom
Jewish British politicians
Ministers in the Attlee governments, 1945–1951
Barons created by George VI